Ernst Francois van Dyk OIS (born 4 April 1973) is a South African wheelchair racer and handcyclist. He has won a record 10 wheelchair titles in the Boston Marathon. He was also awarded the Laureus World Sports Awards for Sportsperson with a Disability of the year for 2006. At the 2000 Summer Paralympics in Sydney, he won a bronze medal in the 400 metres. At the 2004 Summer Paralympics in Athens, he won a silver medal in the 800 metre race, another silver in the 1500 metres, and a bronze in the 5000 metres. At the 2008 Summer Paralympics in Beijing van Dyk won gold in the handcycling road race as well as bronze in the wheelchair marathon. Other handcycling achievements include: Obtaining a silver and bronze medal at the 2009 UCI Para-cycling Road World Championships held in Italy and taking double gold (road race and time trial) at the 2007 UCI Para-cycling Road World Championships held in Bordeaux.

Career 
Van Dyk was born with congenital absence of both legs.  His parents, two provincial-level athletes, recognized his athletic abilities and encouraged sports participation. At first he went to school in Graaff-Reinet, but the school couldn't cater for him. He then attended the Elizabeth Conradie School for disabled children in Kimberley. He competed as a swimmer nationally in his teens. In 1992 he enrolled in Stellenbosch University and competed in the Barcelona Paralympics as a swimmer and wheelchair athlete.  Thereafter, he concentrated on wheelchair athletics.

Major results 

His ninth win in the 2010 Boston Marathon was a record for that event in any class. As of 21 April 2014 he has won ten. On 20 April 2010 the South African government announced that van Dyk will be awarded the Order of Ikhamanga in silver for his achievements in sport.

Personal life 
Van Dyk's company, Enabled Sport, deals in equipment for athletes with disabilities. He lives in Paarl, Western Cape with his wife and daughter.

References

External links
 

People from Ceres, Western Cape
South African wheelchair racers
Laureus World Sports Awards winners
Paralympic athletes of South Africa
Athletes (track and field) at the 2000 Summer Paralympics
Athletes (track and field) at the 2004 Summer Paralympics
Athletes (track and field) at the 2008 Summer Paralympics
Athletes (track and field) at the 2012 Summer Paralympics
Cyclists at the 2008 Summer Paralympics
Cyclists at the 2012 Summer Paralympics
Paralympic gold medalists for South Africa
Paralympic silver medalists for South Africa
Paralympic bronze medalists for South Africa
1973 births
Living people
Boston Marathon winners
Wheelchair racers at the 2000 Summer Olympics
South African male wheelchair racers
Paralympic wheelchair racers
Medalists at the 2000 Summer Paralympics
Medalists at the 2004 Summer Paralympics
Medalists at the 2008 Summer Paralympics
Medalists at the 2012 Summer Paralympics
Recipients of the Order of Ikhamanga
Athletes (track and field) at the 2016 Summer Paralympics
Medalists at the 2016 Summer Paralympics
Paralympic medalists in athletics (track and field)
Sportspeople from the Western Cape